Ben Eisenhardt (בן אייזנהארט; December 3, 1990) is an American-Israeli professional basketball player who plays for Hapoel Be'er Sheva of the Israeli Basketball Premier League, at the power forward/center positions.

Personal life
Eisenhardt was born in Bainbridge Island, Washington, and is Jewish. He is 6' 10" tall (208 cm), and weighs 216 pounds (98 kg). He made aliyah, becoming an Israeli citizen.

Basketball career
Eisenhardt attended Bainbridge High School. He averaged 12 points per game and seven rebounds per game as a senior.

As a freshman in 2010–11, Eisenhardt played basketball for California Polytechnic State University.

He attended Whitman College, playing for the Missionaries, and graduated in 2014. As a junior in 2012–13 Eisenhardt led the Northwest Conference (NWC) in scoring (442 points), was 4th in conference scoring average (16.4 ppg.) and field goal percentage (54.9%), and was 7th in rebounding (6.2 per game).  He became the first Missionary to be named to the National Association of Basketball Coaches Division 3 All-American Third-Team as a junior, and was selected to the D3Hoops.com All-Region Team, and named NWC Player of the Year and First Team All-NWC.  In his senior season, he missed a significant number of games with concussion symptoms.

Eisenhardt plays for Hapoel Be'er Sheva of the Israeli Basketball Premier League, at the power forward/center positions.

References 

1990 births
Living people
American expatriate basketball people in Israel
American men's basketball players
Basketball players from Washington (state)
Cal Poly Mustangs men's basketball players
Centers (basketball)
Hapoel Be'er Sheva B.C. players
Israeli American
Israeli Basketball Premier League players
Israeli men's basketball players
Jewish American sportspeople
Jewish men's basketball players
People from Bainbridge Island, Washington
Power forwards (basketball)
Whitman Blues men's basketball players
21st-century American Jews